Dudley Ryder, 2nd Earl of Harrowby, KG, PC, FRS (19 May 179819 November 1882), styled Viscount Sandon between 1809 and 1847, was a British politician. He held office under Lord Palmerston as Chancellor of the Duchy of Lancaster in 1855 and as Lord Privy Seal between 1855 and 1858.

Background and education
Harrowby was born in London, the son of Dudley Ryder, 1st Earl of Harrowby, and Lady Susan (d. 1838), daughter of Granville Leveson-Gower, 1st Marquess of Stafford. He was educated at Christ Church, Oxford.

He was an officer of the Staffordshire Yeomanry, resigning his captain's commission in March 1831.

Political career
Harrowby was elected Member of Parliament for Tiverton in 1819, a seat he held until 1831 before switching to represent Liverpool until 1847. He served as a Lord of the Admiralty in 1827 and as Secretary to the Board of Control under Lord Grey between 1830 and 1831. He had a London home in Grosvenor Square. 

In 1847, he became Earl of Harrowby and took up a seat in the House of Lords. He remained out of office for a long time, but in 1855, eight years after he had succeeded his father as Earl of Harrowby, he was appointed Chancellor of the Duchy of Lancaster by Lord Palmerston, becoming a Privy Counsellor at the same time. In a few months he was transferred to the office of Lord Privy Seal, a position which he resigned in 1858.

He was made a Knight of the Garter in 1859. Harrowby was also three times President of the Royal Statistical Society (1840–1842, 1849–1851, 1855–1857), chairman of the Maynooth commission and a member of other important royal commissions. He was regarded as among the most stalwart and prominent defenders of the Church of England.

Family

Lord Harrowby married Lady Frances, daughter of John Stuart, 1st Marquess of Bute, in 1823. She died in March 1859. Harrowby remained a widower until his death at Sandon Hall on 19 November 1882, aged 84. He was succeeded in the earldom by his eldest son, Dudley.

References

External links 

 

1798 births
1882 deaths
Staffordshire Yeomanry officers
Chancellors of the Duchy of Lancaster
Earls of Harrowby
Knights of the Garter
Lords Privy Seal
Members of the Privy Council of the United Kingdom
Ryder, Dudley
Presidents of the Royal Statistical Society
Fellows of the Royal Society
Ryder, Dudley
Ryder, Dudley
Ryder, Dudley
Ryder, Dudley
Ryder, Dudley
Ryder, Dudley
Ryder, Dudley
Ryder, Dudley
Ryder, Dudley
Harrowby, E2
Dudley